Sticky Notes, also known as The Backup Dancer, is a 2016 American drama film written and directed by Amanda Sharp, produced by Katie Mustard, and starring Ray Liotta, Rose Leslie, Gina Rodriguez and Justin Bartha.

Premise
The film centers around Athena (Leslie), a backup dancer who returns home to Florida, to help care for her estranged father Jack (Liotta), who has been diagnosed with cancer.

Cast
 Ray Liotta as Jack
 Rose Leslie as Athena
 Gina Rodriguez as Natalia
 Justin Bartha as Bryan

Production
The film was directed by Amanda Sharp in her directorial debut.

References

External links
 
 

2016 films
2010s English-language films